Normand Joseph Gilles Dupont (born February 5, 1957) is a Canadian retired ice hockey forward.

As a youth, he played in the 1970 Quebec International Pee-Wee Hockey Tournament with a minor ice hockey team from Montréal-Nord.

Dupont started his National Hockey League career with the Montreal Canadiens in 1979. He also played for the Winnipeg Jets and Hartford Whalers. He left the NHL after the 1984 season. He played 8 seasons in the Swiss National League A before retiring from hockey.

Career statistics

References

External links

1957 births
Living people
Binghamton Whalers players
Birmingham Bulls draft picks
Canadian expatriate ice hockey players in Switzerland
EHC Biel players
Hartford Whalers players
HC Ajoie players
Ice hockey people from Montreal
Montreal Bleu Blanc Rouge players
Montreal Canadiens draft picks
Montreal Canadiens players
Montreal Juniors players
National Hockey League first-round draft picks
Nova Scotia Voyageurs players
Sherbrooke Jets players
Winnipeg Jets (1979–1996) players
Canadian ice hockey left wingers